Jungermanniopsida is the largest of three classes within the division Marchantiophyta (liverworts).

Phylogeny
Based on the work by Novíkov & Barabaš-Krasni 2015.

Taxonomy
 Jungermanniidae Engler 1893
 Jungermanniales von Klinggräff 1858
 Cephaloziineae Schljakov
 Adelanthaceae Grolle 1972 [Jamesoniellaceae He-Nygrén et al. 2006]
 Anastrophyllaceae Söderström et al. 2010b
 Cephaloziaceae Migula 1904
 Cephaloziellaceae Douin 1920 [Phycolepidoziaceae Schuster 1967]
 Lophoziaceae Cavers 1910
 Scapaniaceae Migula 1904 [Diplophyllaceae Potemk. 1999; Chaetophyllopsaceae Schuster 1960]
 Jungermanniineae Schuster ex Stotler & Crandall-Stotler 2000
 Acrobolbaceae Hodgson 1962
 Antheliaceae Schuster 1963
 Arnelliaceae Nakai 1943
 Balantiopsidaceae Buch 1955 [Isotachidaceae]
 Blepharidophyllaceae Schuster 2002
 Calypogeiaceae Arnell 1928 [Mizutaniaceae Furuki & Iwatsuki 1989]
 Endogemmataceae Konstantinova, Vilnet & Troitsky 2011
 Geocalycaceae von Klinggräff 1858
 Gymnomitriaceae von Klinggräff 1858
 Gyrothyraceae Schuster 1970
 Harpanthaceae Arnell 1928
 Hygrobiellaceae Konstantinova & Vilnet 2014
 Jackiellaceae Schuster 1972
 Jungermanniaceae Reichenbach 1828 [Mesoptychiaceae Inoue & Steere 1975; Delavayellaceae Schuster 1961]
 Notoscyphaceae Crandall-Stotler, Vana & Stotler
 Saccogynaceae Heeg
 Solenostomataceae Stotler & Crandall-Stotler 2009
 Southbyaceae Váňa et al. 2012
 Stephaniellaceae Schuster 2002
 Trichotemnomataceae Schuster 1972
 Lophocoleineae Schljakov 1972
 Blepharostomataceae Frey & Stech 2008
 Brevianthaceae Engel & Schuster 1981
 Chonecoleaceae Schuster ex Grolle 1972
 Grolleaceae Solari ex Schuster 1984
 Herbertaceae Müller ex Fulford & Hatcher 1958
 Lepicoleaceae Schuster 1963 [Vetaformataceae Fulford & Taylor 1963]
 Lepidoziaceae Limpricht 1877 [Neogrollaceae]
 Lophocoleaceae Vanden Berghen 1956
 Mastigophoraceae Schuster 1972
 Plagiochilaceae Müller & Herzog 1956
 Pseudolepicoleaceae Fulford & Taylor 1960 [Herzogiariaceae; Chaetocoleaceae]
 Trichocoleaceae Nakai 1943
 Myliineae Engel & Braggins ex Crandall-Stotler et al.
 Myliaceae Schljakov 1975
 Perssoniellineae Schuster 1963
 Schistochilaceae Buch 1928 [Perssoniellaceae Schuster ex Grolle 1972]
 Porellales Schljakov 1972
 Jubulineae Müller 1909
 Frullaniaceae Lorch 1914
 Jubulaceae von Klinggräff 1858
 Lejeuneaceae Cavers 1910 [Metzgeriopsaceae]
 Porellineae Schuster 1963
 Goebeliellaceae Verdoorn 1932
 Lepidolaenaceae Nakai 1943 [Jubulopsaceae]
 Porellaceae Cavers 1910 nom. cons. [Macvicariaceae]
 Radulineae Schuster 1963
 Radulaceae Müller 1909
 Ptilidiales Schljakov 1972
 Herzogianthaceae Stotler & Crandall-Stotler 2009
 Neotrichocoleaceae Inoue 1974
 Ptilidiaceae von Klinggräff 1858
 Metzgeriidae Bartholomew-Began 1990
 Metzgeriales Chalaud 1930
 Aneuraceae von Klinggräff 1858 [Riccardiaceae; Verdoorniaceae Inoue 1976]
 Metzgeriaceae von Klinggräff 1858 [Vandiemeniaceae Hewson]
 Pleuroziales Schljakov 1972
 Pleuroziaceae Müller 1909
 Pelliidae He-Nygrén et al. 2006
 Fossombroniales Schljakov 1972
 Calyculariineae He-Nygrén et al. 2006
 Calyculariaceae He-Nygrén et al. 2006
 Fossombroniineae Schuster ex Stotler & Crandall-Stotler 2000 [Codoniineae]
 Allisoniaceae Schljakov 1975
 Fossombroniaceae Hazsl. nom. cons. 1885 [Codoniaceae]
 Petalophyllaceae Stotler & Crandall-Stotler 2002
 Makinoiineae He-Nygrén et al. 2006
 Makinoaceae Nakai 1943
 Pallaviciniales Frey & Stech 2005
 Pallaviciniineae Schuster 1984
 Hymenophytaceae Schuster 1963
 Moerckiaceae Stotler & Crandall-Stotler 2007
 Pallaviciniaceae Migula 1904 [Dilaenaceae Müller 1940; Symphyogynaceae Reimers 1952]
 Sandeothallaceae Schuster 1984
 Phyllothalliineae Schuster 1967
 Phyllothalliaceae Hodgson 1964
 Pelliales He-Nygrén et al. 2006
 Noterocladaceae Frey & Stech 2005
 Pelliaceae von Klinggräff 1858

References 

Liverworts
Plant classes